Solo Live may refer to:
Solo Live (David Murray album), 1980
Solo Live (Michel Petrucciani album), 1998